Model Farms High School is a public  high school in Baulkham Hills, a suburb in northwest Sydney, New South Wales. The school is named so because the area was set up to demonstrate farming practices to convicts and others who wished to start a farm when the first settlers arrived. The school was built and established in 1975.

Houses 
A new school house system was introduced in 2007, with some major changes to the old system. It includes receiving house points for merits and awards, as well as sporting events like the annual swimming carnival. The houses consist of Chisholm (green), Peel (blue), Thompson (red), and Wentworth (yellow).

See also 
 List of Government schools in New South Wales

References

External links
 Model Farms High School website

Notable People
Josh Rochford

Public high schools in Sydney
1975 establishments in Australia
Baulkham Hills, New South Wales
Educational institutions established in 1975